Ampelomeryx is a genus of extinct herbivorous even-toed ungulate mammals belonging to the family Palaeomerycidae.

Ampelomeryx was named by Duranthon et al. (1995). It was assigned to the Palaeomerycinae by Prothero and Liter (2007). It had frontal and occipital appendages. It was similar to Tauromeryx and Triceromeryx.

References 

Palaeomerycidae
Miocene even-toed ungulates
Prehistoric even-toed ungulate genera
Fossil taxa described in 1995